Fengxian may refer to:

Fengxian District (奉贤区), Shanghai
Feng County, Jiangsu (丰县), sometimes romanised as Fengxian
Feng County, Shaanxi (凤县), sometimes romanised as Fengxian
Lü Bu (? - 198 AD), courtesy name Fengxian, Chinese military general during the late Eastern Han Dynasty